We Did It is a 1936 Fleischer Studio animated short film, starring Betty Boop, and featuring Pudgy the Pup.

Synopsis
Betty leaves her pet Pudgy home alone with three adorable little kittens. As soon as Betty is out the door, the kittens begin to make mischief, turning the house into shambles. When Betty returns, she assumes the damage was caused by Pudgy, and punishes the innocent pup. The guilty kittens emerge from hiding and confess by singing the title song. A contrite Betty apologizes to Pudgy, and gives him a big bowl of ice cream shaped like a mountain.

References

External links
 We Did It at the Big Cartoon Database.
 We Did It on YouTube.
 We Did It at IMDb.

1936 short films
Betty Boop cartoons
1930s American animated films
American black-and-white films
1936 animated films
Paramount Pictures short films
Fleischer Studios short films
Short films directed by Dave Fleischer
Animated films about dogs
Animated films about cats
1930s English-language films
American animated short films